The Grammy Award for Best Pop Solo Performance is an award presented at the Grammy Awards, a ceremony that was established in 1958 and originally called the Gramophone Awards. According to the 54th Grammy Awards description guides, the Best Pop Solo Performance Award as being designed for a solo performance pop recording (vocal and instrumental) and is limited to singles or tracks only.

The category was introduced in 2012 and combined the previous categories for Best Female Pop Vocal Performance, Best Male Pop Vocal Performance and Best Pop Instrumental Performance. The restructuring of these categories was a result of the Recording Academy's wish to decrease the list of categories and awards and to eliminate the distinctions between male and female (and in some cases, solo instrumental) performances.

The award goes to the performing artist. The producer, engineer and songwriter can apply for a Winners Certificate.

Adele became the inaugural recipient, has the most victories (with four wins), and is the only act so far to win this category for consecutive years. Kelly Clarkson, Taylor Swift, Ariana Grande, and Adele lead all performers with four nominations.

Recipients

Artists with multiple awards

4 wins
Adele

2 wins
Ed Sheeran

Artists with multiple nominations 

4 nominations
 Adele
 Kelly Clarkson
 Ariana Grande
 Taylor Swift

3 nominations
 Justin Bieber
 Billie Eilish
 Lady Gaga
 Katy Perry

2 nominations
 Beyoncé
Doja Cat
Lizzo
 Bruno Mars
 P!nk
 Ed Sheeran
Harry Styles

See also 
 Grammy Award for Best Female Pop Vocal Performance
 Grammy Award for Best Male Pop Vocal Performance 
 Grammy Award for Best Pop Instrumental Performance

References

External links 
 Official website of the Grammy Awards

 
Awards established in 2012
Pop Solo Performance
Solo Performance